Puffia is a monotypic genus of flowering plants in the family Rubiaceae. The genus contains only one species, viz. Puffia gerrardii, which is restricted to the littoral forests of southeastern Madagascar.

References

Monotypic Rubiaceae genera
Palicoureeae
Taxa named by Birgitta Bremer